The Autumn Classic International is a figure skating competition organized by Skate Canada. It is part of the ISU Challenger Series in some years. Medals may be awarded in the disciplines of men's singles, ladies' singles, pair skating, and ice dancing on the senior and junior levels.

Senior results
CS: ISU Challenger Series

Men

Ladies

Pairs

Ice dancing

Junior results

Men

Ladies

References

External links
 Official website of Skate Canada

 
Sport in Barrie
ISU Challenger Series
International figure skating competitions hosted by Canada